Pat Finn may refer to:
 Pat Finn (game show host) (born 1956), American television presenter and game show host
 Pat Finn (actor) (born 1965), American film and television actor